Ulagalandha Perumal Temple is a temple dedicated to Vishnu located in Kanchipuram, Tamil Nadu, India. Constructed in the Dravidian style of architecture, the temple is glorified in the Naalayira Divya Prabandham, the early medieval Tamil canon of the Alvar saints from the 6th through 9th centuries CE. It is one of the 108 Divya Desams dedicated to Vishnu, who is worshipped as Ulagalantha Perumal, and his consort Lakshmi as Amuthavalli. The temple is believed to have been built by the Pallavas, with later contributions from the medieval Cholas, Vijayanagara kings, and Madurai Nayaks.

The temple is found in Big Kanchipuram, and situated close Kamakshi Amman Temple. The temple complex actually houses four Divya Desams in its different precincts, namely, Tirukkaravanam, Tirukarakam, Tiruneerakam, and Tiruürakam, that last of which is present with in the sanctum sanctorum of the main temple.

Vamana, the Brahmin dwarf, and one of the ten avatars of Vishnu, is held to have appeared here to quell the pride of the asura king Mahabali. As Ulagalantha Perumal, he is believed to have appeared before king Mahabali and the Alvars. Six daily rituals and a dozen yearly festivals are held at the temple, of which the chariot festival, celebrated during the Tamil month of Chittirai (March–April), is the most prominent. The temple is maintained and administered by the Hindu Religious and Endowment Board of the Government of Tamil Nadu.

Legend

The Bhagavata Purana describes that Vishnu descended as the Vamana avatar to restore the authority of Indra over Svarga, as it had been taken by Mahabali, a benevolent asura King. Bali was the grandson of Prahlada. King Mahabali was generous, and engaged in severe austerities, winning the praise of the world. With the praise from his courtiers and others, he regarded himself as the most powerful being in the world. Vamana, in the guise of a short Brahmin carrying a wooden umbrella, went to the king to request three paces of land. Mahabali consented, against the warning of his guru, Shukracharya. Vamana then revealed his identity, and enlarged to gigantic proportions to stride over the three worlds. He stepped from heaven to earth with the first step, from earth to the netherworld with the second. With all the dominions he held effectively under Vamana's strides. King Mahabali, unable to fulfill his promise, offered his head for the third. Vamana then placed his foot upon the humbled monarch, banishing him to the netherworld. Some texts also report that Vamana did not step into the netherworld, and instead gave its rule to Mahabali. 

In his giant form, Vamana is known as Trivikrama. The legend is associated with the Thrikkakara Temple in Kerala and also with this temple and Ulagalantha Perumal Temple, Tirukoyilur.

History and inscriptions

According to the historian Nagaswamy, based on the inscriptions and the location of the temple, it is the oldest temple in Kanchipuram. There is another account that the temple is developed by Rajendra Chola I (1012–1044 CE). The temple has 15 inscriptions from various dynasties like Pallavas, Chola and Sambuvarayars. The earliest inscription is from 846 CE during the regime of Nandivarman III (846–869 CE). There is a Chola inscription dated 1110 CE during the reign of Kulothunga Chola I (1070–1120 CE) indicating his visit to the temple and his gift of land to the temple whose income was to be used for the maintenance of the temple. Another similar inscription indicates the donation of a village by the king on behest of his queen Kampamadeviyar. There are inscriptions from later Chola kings like Rajadhiraja Chola II (1166–1178 CE) and Rajaraja Chola III (1216-1256 CE) indicating various records of gifts to the temple. There are also inscriptions from minor chieftains like Vijaya Gandagopala indicating gifts to the temple.
The inscriptions refer the main deity by various names like Thiru Uragathu Ninru-arulina Paramaswamin, Tiru Uragathaḻvar and Tiru Uragathu Emberuman. The Sambuvarayar rule of the 16th century records the gift of a pond and a grove in Sevvanmedu village. The temple still continues to possess this grove. The inscriptions in the temple also indicate increased trade and commerce during the Pallava period, with licenses provided to shops like oil, ghee, arecanut, vegetables, flowers, coconut, sugar, cloth and sandal. The temple has not received a single donation from the ruling Vijayanagara Empire, though the nearby temples received generous donations, indicating that the temple had sources of income. From those days Pancharatra Agama was followed in the temple, though all the surrounding people followed Vaikhanasa and Pancharatra Agama.

Parimelalhagar, the 13th-century Tirukkural commentator, belonged to the lineage of priests of the Ulagalantha Perumal temple.

Architecture

The temple is located in central Kanchipuram, a locality in the Central side of Kanchipuram, a South Indian town in the state of Tamil Nadu. The temple houses four Divya Desams on its own – they are Tirukkaravanam, Tirukarakam, Tiruürakam, and Tiruneerakam. It is believed that all the shrines were probably separate temples, but the circumstances which lead do these temples getting housed in the Ulagalantha Perumal temple is not known. Thirumangai Alvar has sung praises of all the four temples in a single verse. The temple tank, Naga Tirtham, is located outside the main temple complex.

The temple is revered by the verses of Tirumangai Alvar and Thirumaḻisai Alvar. Thaayar of the temple is Amuthavalli (Amirthavalli) and the festival deity of the temple is Loganathan. The right leg is seen placed on the head of Mahabali with two fingers on his left hand stretched out referring to the two steps he took to measure the two worlds and the stretched finger on his right hand indicating the question the posted to Mahabali as to where he could place his third step. The roof of the sanctum, the vimana has an elevated roof to accommodate the huge image of the presiding deity.

Tiruürakam 
The central shrine of temple is most commonly referred as Peragam, while the smaller shrine where the image of the snake god Adishesha is houses is called Tiruürakam. As per tradition, Mahabali at the foot of Vamana, could not view the deity's vishvarupam, and requested him to manifest as a smaller form. Vishnu obliged, and appeared as a snake in a smaller shrine. The shrine is frequented by childless couple praying for offspring.

Tirukkarakam
The shrine is located on the third precinct of the temple. As per Hindu legend, sage Garga performed his penance at this temple and obtained knowledge. The place thus derived its name Garagaham, which later became Karakam. The presiding deity of the shrine is Karunakara Perumal facing north and seated on Adishesha and his consort Padmamani Nachiyar. The temple tank associated with it is called Agraya Tirtham, and the vimana is called Vamana Vimanam or Ramaya Vimanam.

Tirukkaravanam
The shrine is located in the second precinct. The presiding deity is called Kalvar and faces north, while his consort is Kamalvalli Thayar. Gauri Tatakam and Taratara Tatakam are the temple tanks associated with the temple and the vimana is called Puskala Vimana. There is a separate for Aranavalli Thayar.

Tiruneerakam
The temple has no presiding deity, but just a festive image probably brought from other shrine. The images of the festival deity, Jagadishvara, facing the east and having four arms, is housed in a hall in the second precinct. The water body associated with the temple is Akrura Tirtham and the vimana is Jagadishvara Vimanam. According to Pillai Perumal Aiyangar in his Nurrettrutiruppatiyantati, Vishnu revealed himself to a sage in the form of a child as a banyan leaf.

Festivals and religious practices

The temple priests perform the puja (rituals) during festivals and on a daily basis. As at other Vishnu temples of Tamil Nadu, the priests belong to the Vaishnavaite community, a Brahmin community. The temple rituals are performed six times a day: Ushathkalam at 7 a.m., Kalasanthi at 8:00 a.m., Uchikalam at 12:00 p.m., Sayarakshai at 6:00 p.m., Irandamkalam at 7:00 p.m. and Ardha Jamam at 10:00 p.m. Each ritual has three steps: alangaram (decoration), neivethanam (food offering) and deepa aradanai (waving of lamps) for both Ulagalantha Perumal and Amuthavalli. During the last step of worship, nagaswaram (pipe instrument) and tavil (percussion instrument) are played, religious instructions in the Vedas (sacred text) are recited by priests, and worshippers prostrate themselves in front of the temple mast. There are weekly, monthly and fortnightly rituals performed in the temple. There are two major festivals celebrated in the temple - Brahmotsavam during the Tamil month of Thai (January–February) and Vamana Jayanthi during the Tamil month of Avani (August–September) on Sravanam star.

Religious significance
The temple is revered in Naalayira Divya Prabandham, the 7th–9th century Vaishnava canon, by Thirumangai Alvar in one hymn of Thirunedunthandagam. The temple is classified as a Divya Desam, one of the 108 Vishnu temples that are mentioned in the book. The temple is unique among Divya Desams as it is the only temple complex that houses four different Divya Desams.

Notes

References

External links

 
Hindu temples in Kanchipuram
Vamana temples